Kelso Sevens is an annual rugby sevens event held by Kelso RFC, in Kelso, Scotland. This was one of a group of Sevens tournaments instated after the First World War extending the original Borders Spring Circuit. The Kelso Sevens began in 1920.

The Kelso Sevens is part of the Kings of the Sevens championship run by the Border League.

2019's Kelso Sevens will be played on 4 May 2019.

Sports Day

The Kelso Sevens tournament began as a Sports Day in 1920.

Invited Sides

Various sides have been invited to play in the Kelso Sevens tournament throughout the years.

Scotland 7s won the final in 1996 beating Kenya 7s.

London Scottish won the Kelso Sevens in 1991 and reached the final in 1988.

The Army side Royal Signals of Catterick won in 1954 and 1957 and reached the final in 1953. Cardiff Training College won in 1969 and reached the final in 1967, 1968 and 1972. The English invitational side Public School Wanderers won in 1985 and reached the final in 1986.

Sponsorship

Border Toyota of St. Boswells is sponsoring the 2019 Kelso Sevens.

Past winners

See also
 Kelso RFC
 Borders Sevens Circuit
 Scottish Rugby Union

References 

Rugby sevens competitions in Scotland
Rugby union in the Scottish Borders